TV One Global is one of the main entertainment channels in Pakistan. The channel launched on 15 September 2005 and provides programmes in many genres. This is the list of programming currently, Upcoming and formerly broadcast by TVOne Pakistan.

Current programming

Acquired Programming
Harjai

Drama
 Susralies
 Mor Moharan
 Dil Bhatkay
 Aye Mohabbat
 Khawaja Naveed Ki Adaalat (Season 2)

Anthology
Shehar Ki Raatein
The Songs Of Love

Non-scripted/Reality Shows
Family Ronaq
Jumma Mubarak
What The Fun
Morning Star with Azfar Rehman
The Mazedaar Show (Season 2)
To Be Honest (Season 3)
The Big Pick

Upcoming Shows

Drama
Do Boond Pani

Formerly broadcast

Anthologies
Boltay Afsanay
Doosra Sach
Kahani Pyaar Ki
One Films
Teledrama
Teletheatre
Telecinema
Zindagi Dhoop Chuhan

Comedy/Sitcoms

3rd Umpire
Aqal Bari Ya Bhains
Baar Baar Beo
Bhatti & DD
Behind The Scene
Colony 52
Chicken Cabinet
Enaaya
Funkari
Gudgudee
Get Set Go
Hulla Ray
Haan Ji Haan
Joey
Mirza Aur Shamim Aara
Munni Ka Dhabba
Naya Kar Yaar
Sabir Ali Aur Betiyan
Susralies
Udhaam Family

Horror/supernatural
Chanar Ghati
Dhund

Drama series

Aadat
Aania
Aye Mohabbat
Aas
Adhuri Kahani
Aik Haath Ki Taali
Aik Thi Paro
Ajnabi Shehr Kay Ajnabi Raaste
Anjanay Nagar
Angoori
Anhoni
Amar Bail
Bhinak
Band Khirkyon Kay Peechay
Bewafa Hum Na They
Connections
Chakrees
Dastaar E Anaa
Dil Bhatkay
Dil-e-Majboor
Dil Manay Na
Dil Na Umeed To Nahi
Dil Hi Tou Hai
Direct Line
Faslay Hain Darmiyaan
Ghughi
Hotel
House Of Commons
Haroon Piya Tou Teri
Husun Ara Kaun
Hum Paridnay
Ideals
Imam Zamin
Ishq Pagal Karay
Ishq Samandar
Jaltay Gulab
Jalti Rait Per
Juda Na Hona
Jeena Isi Ka Naam Hai
Kuch To Hota Hai
Karamat-e-Ishq
Kasak Rahay Ge
Kaun Sitare Choo Sakta Hai
Kaanton Say Aagay
Khamosh Mohabbat
Khanabadosh
Kharashain
Khelo Pyaar Ki Baazi
Khuda Gawah
Khushboo Ka Safar
Khuwabzaadi
Laaj
Manchali
Mann Pyasa
Mann Se Poocho
Maryam Periera
Manzil Na Janay Kahan
Mazung De Meena Sheena
Mein Sitara
Mera Maan Rakhna
Meray Dil Meray Musafir
 Mor Moharan
 Mohabbat Hogai Tum Se
 Mohabbat Khel Tamasha
Munkir
Muthi Bhar Chaawal
Naqqar E Khuda
Nindiya Kaun Jalti Jaye
Naulakha
New York Se New Karachi
 Noori
Parizaad
Pyaar Ka Pagalpan
Pyar Ho Jaane Do
Ro Raha Hai Dil
Rockstar
Raat Aur Raaz
Samandar
Saiyaan Way
Sathiyaa
Seep
Seeta Bagri
Shaggo
Shatranj
Sipahi Maqbool Hussain (Mini-series)
Tere Anjani Say
Tanha Dil
Taan
Tu Jo Nahi
Tumhari Zofeen
Tumhe Yaad Karte Karte
Ussay Bhool Ja
Yeh Junoon
Wafa Ka Mausam
Wafa Lazim To Nahi
Yeh Pyar Hai
Yaqeen
Zara Si Bhool
Zard Patay Say Yeh Dil
Zindagi Aur Kitne Zakham

Special Programming
Ishq Ramazan
Rooh e Ramazan

Non-scripted/Reality shows

Aap Ka Sahir
Andaz Apna Apna
Brand Power
Blockbuster Movies
Business Review
Bolo Tou Jeeto Gay
Dholak
Deen Dialogue
E On One
Expert On One
Entertainment World
For Him
Gata Rahay Mera Dil
Happy Hour
Kiva
Kausati Mastermind
Kya Yeh Sab Drama Hai
Lakh Rupay Ka Knockout Show
Living Arts & Designs
Meri Dunya
Muskurati Morning
Naya Andaaz
Nyla's Lounge
Ramp Razmatazz
Sirat-e-Mustaqeem
Social Diaries
Style India
Style Icon
Shes On One
Secondhand
Spotlight
Survivor Pakistan
Taboo
The Mazedaar Show
The Sahir Show
The World In Your Kitchen
The World This Week
The Uncensored Show
Udhaam Nite

Talk Shows
Expert On One
Happy YourKivaSunday GurusShes On OneSoaps OperasDaag e DilDon't JealousGali Mein Chand NiklaJalti BarishKaisi Hai Yeh ZindagiKuch Ishq Tha Kuch Majboori ThiLailaLove In Gulshan-e-BaharMadhoshMain Bhi Khuwab Dekhti HoonMeri Wife Kay LiyeMohabbat Behta DariyaMohabbat Humsafar MeriOrangi Ki AnwariPhir Kab MilogePura Dekh Ka ChandRailway ColonySapno Ki Oat MainSirf Aik BaarShahista ShahistaAcquired ProgrammingAiza Aur NissaBeqarar DilDoraha (Urdu dub of Kördügüm)Dastan-e-AndulusDancing QueenHarjai (Urdu dub of Hercai)Kairi — Rishta Khatta MeethaKoffee with KaranMeri Aashiqui Tum Se HiNadamatPratigyaShah MahalSwaraginiSponsored ProgrammingAlways Girls CanAlways Karo YaqeenBattle of the BandsCoke Studio PakistanCommander SafeguardDettol WarriorsEasypaisa RaahiHo YaqeenKnorr Noodle Boriyat BusterKnorr Noodle Boriyat Buster 2Miss VeetMiss Veet 2Meray Dost Meray YaarMeray Dost Meray Yaar 2National Ka PakistanNestlé Nido Young StarsNestle Nesvita Women of Strength '09Nescafe BasementNesfruta FankaarSprite Spice WarsTelenor IChampTelenor Karo Mumkin ShowUth RecordsUth Records 2Veet Celebration of BeautyVeet Miss Super ModelVeet Miss Super Model 2Veet Miss Super Model 3Veet Miss Super Model 4Veet Miss Super Model 5TelefilmsAatishAkhri GhantiAb Bajegi ShehnaiAchar WaliAnjaan MusafirBin Bulae Abba JanBonga BABeqararBegairatBeech Ki AarhBakhtawarBade Main DeewanayBadtameez IshqChura Ke Dil MeraChatpati MohabbatDeemakDastakDaawaDoosra HuttDaam-e-MohabbatDiya Jalaye RakhnaDil ParosiEid Loadshedding MubarakGori Ki DukanGori Teri EidiGudgudeeGumshuda MehmoobaHum ZubanIn Se MileyKojiKoila Bhiona RaakhKhamoshiKhalishLadies TailorLala Ki FilmLyari Ki TeerMohraMushtariMeri AmmiMeri AwazMera Ka HeroMeray Sanwariya Ka NaamMaidMai Cheemi Ka FaislaMaan Jaaye NaManjhele Bhaiya Ki BetiMain Tu Pyaa SeNimmo Papad WaliNayyer Aapa Ki Silai MachinePardaPyar Nahi Hota Bar BarPenaltyRaees KhanaRahay Salamat JodiReady Steady BhaagRiyasat Mae RiyasatShorSaudaSare Zameen ParSapnaySuper SaasSurpriseShiddatShaadi ImpossibleShahrukh Khan Ki MautStreet 27Sehar Hone TakTohmatTu Jo NahinTauheenUper Bhabi Ka MakanWadaYeh DostiYeh To Hona Hi ThaZara Ther JaoZara Naam Ho TouForeign SeriesFBIFear Factor - Khatron Ke KhiladiHawaii Five-OJhalak Dikhhla JaaLostLethal WeaponSupernatural''

References

TVOne Pakistan
TV One Pakistan